Peter Martin (born 1940) is an English literature scholar, biographer, and an 18th century garden historian. He was educated and has taught in the United States. He lives in England and Spain.

Biography
Martin has been a professor at Miami University; the College of William & Mary; New England College in Arundale, West Sussex, England; and in the English department of Principia College (1993–2002). For several years, he was a garden historian for the Colonial Williamsburg Foundation.

He has written several books on historical and biographical topics, including Samuel Johnson: A Biography, A Life of James Boswell, and about Edmond Malone. His has written about gardens and gardening in Williamsburg and Colonial Virginia, including British and American Gardens in the Eighteenth Century, The Gardening World of Alexander Pope and Pursuing Innocent Pleasures. He also created 'the dictionary wars' in American lexicography and A Dog Called Perth about the 21-year relationship with his dog.

Martin was born and lived in Argentina until the age of ten. He is a 1962 graduate of the Principia College in Elsah, Illinois. He has lived in a village in Sussex, England and El Campello, Spain.

Published works

References

Further reading

1940 births
Living people
21st-century American historians
21st-century American male writers
American academics of English literature
20th-century American biographers
21st-century American biographers
Miami University faculty
University of Illinois Urbana-Champaign alumni
Syracuse University alumni
Principia College faculty
College of William & Mary faculty
American male non-fiction writers